Karunagappalli railway station (Code:KPY) or Karunagappally railway station is a railway station in the Indian municipal town of Karunagappalli in Kollam district, Kerala. Karunagappalli railway station falls under the Thiruvananthapuram railway division of the Southern Railway zone of Indian Railways. Karunagappally KSRTC Bus Station is only 2 km away from the station. It is one among the railway stations in Kerala collecting crores of rupees through passenger tickets every year (NSG 5 Category station). Karunagappalli is the nearest railway station to Amritapuri. Free WiFi of railway is available here. Karunagappalli is connected to various cities in India like Kollam, Trivandrum, Kochi, Calicut, Palakkad, Thrissur, Punalur, Bengaluru, Udupi, Mumbai, Madurai, Kanyakumari, Vishakapatnam, Mangalore, Pune, Salem, Coimbatore, Trichy, Tirunelveli, Hyderabad  etc. through Indian Railways. In 2019, the rail wi-fi broad-band connection has been introduced in Karunagappalli station.

Tourist attractions
The main tourist attraction is the house boat facility in Alumkadavu which is close (only 3 km) to Karunagappally town. Sree Narayana Trophy boat race, an annual boat race is organised in the Kannety (Pallickal) River, Karunagappally, during the season of Onam Festival. The famous Chinese fishing nets can be found on the banks of the lagoon. The Amritapuri ashram is also situated in Vallikavu, which is 8 km from karunagappally. Other tourist attractions are Alumkadavu Backwater, Oachira Temple, Pandarathuruth Church, Sheik Masjid Mosque, Padanayarkulangara Mahadeva Temple, Thazhava, Sasthamkotta Lake etc.

Recently, Azheekal Beach is gaining popularity as a local tourist attraction and boating (houseboat and speedboat) available in Kannetty Kayal (lake) in Karunagappally.
 
Thodiyoor is the nearest village in the railway station. In here so many lakes, rivers and shrubs. Odayilmukk, Veluthamanal, Edakulangara, Theepatti Mukk are the nearest places.

Services
Express trains having halt at the station.

Passenger trains having halt at the station

Facilities
Computerised reservation ticket center
Computerised unreserved ticket center
Automatic ticket vending machine
Rail-wire Wi-Fi
Upper Class passenger waiting room
ATM counter SBI
Foot overbridge
Public addressing system
Catering stalls
Auto stand (24x7)
Prepaid parking space
Coach indication board
Wheelchairs
Water cooler

See also
 Kollam Junction railway station
 Paravur railway station
 Punalur railway station
 Kottarakara railway station
 Eravipuram railway station
 Annual passenger earnings details of railway stations in Kerala

References

Karunagappalli
Thiruvananthapuram railway division
Railway stations opened in 1958
1958 establishments in Kerala